The economy of Guatemala is a considered a developing economy, highly dependent on agriculture, particularly on traditional crops such as coffee, sugar, and bananas. Guatemala's GDP per capita is roughly one-third of Brazil's. The Guatemalan economy is the largest in Central America. It grew 3.3 percent on average from 2015 to 2018. However, Guatemala remains one of the poorest countries in Latin America and the Caribbean, having highly unequal incomes and chronically malnourished children. The country is beset by political insecurity, and lacks skilled workers and infrastructure. It depends on remittances for nearly one-tenth of the GDP.

The 1996 peace accords ended the 36-years-long Guatemalan Civil War, and removed a major obstacle to foreign investment. Since then Guatemala has pursued important reforms and macroeconomic stabilization. On 1 July 2006, the Central American Free Trade Agreement (CAFTA) entered into force between the United States and Guatemala. It has since spurred increased investment in the export sector. The distribution of income remains highly unequal, with 12% of the population living below the international poverty line. Guatemala's large expatriate community in the United States, has made it the top remittance recipient in Central America. These inflows are a primary source of foreign income, equivalent to nearly two-thirds of exports.

Guatemala's gross domestic product for 1990 was estimated at $19.1 billion, with real growth slowing to approximately 3.3%. Ten years later, in 2000, it rose from 1 to 4% and by 2010 it had fallen back to 3%, according to the World Bank. The final peace accord in December 1996 left Guatemala well-positioned for rapid economic growth.

Guatemala's economy is dominated by the private sector, which generates about 85% of GDP. Most of its manufacturing is light assembly and food processing, geared to the domestic, U.S., and Central American markets. In 1990 the labor force participation rate for women was 42%, later increasing by 1% in 2000 to 43% and 51% in 2010. For men, the labor force participation rate in 1990 was about 89%, decreased to 88% in 2000, and increased up to 90% in 2010 (World Bank). Self-employment for men is about 50%, while the rate for women is about 32% (Pagàn 1).

Over the past several years, tourism and exports of textiles, apparel, and nontraditional agricultural products such as winter vegetables, fruit, and cut flowers have boomed, while more traditional exports such as sugar, bananas, and coffee continue to represent a large share of the export market.Over the past twenty years the percentage of exports of goods and services has fluctuated. In 1990 it was 21% and in 2000, 20%. It increased again in 2010 to 26%. On the other hand, its level of imports of goods and services has continually increased. In 1990 its imports of goods and services was about 25%. In 2000 it increased by 4% up to 29%, and in 2010 it increased up to 36%. Migration is another important avenue in Guatemala. According to Cecilia Menjivar, remittances are "central to the economy." In 2004 remittances to Guatemala from men's migration to the U.S. accounted for approximately 97% (Menjivar 2).

The United States is the country's largest trading partner, providing 36% of Guatemala's imports and receiving 40% of its exports. The government sector is small and shrinking, with its business activities limited to public utilities—some of which have been privatized—ports and airports and several development-oriented financial institutions. Guatemala was certified to receive export trade benefits under the United States' Caribbean Basin Trade and Partnership Act (CBTPA) in October 2000, and enjoys access to U.S. Generalized System of Preferences (GSP) benefits. Due to concerns over serious worker rights protection issues, however, Guatemala's benefits under both the CBTPA and GSP are currently under review.

The country is predominantly poor, with 49 percent of the population living in rural areas. Guatemala is characterized by a markedly unequal distribution of wealth, assets, and opportunities: between 2000 and 2014, rural poverty increased from 74.5 to 76.1 percent, while extreme rural poverty increased from 23.8 to 35.3 percent. Young people and indigenous communities are the most vulnerable. Among indigenous people, who comprise almost 40 percent of the total population, the poverty rate is approximately 80 percent.

The Inequality-adjusted HDI (IHDI) index for Guatemala is 0.481 (Data from 2019), below the average for Latin America (0.596) and distant from the countries with very high human development (0.800).

Economic development and poverty in Guatemala

From 1990 until 2018, Guatemala was growing with an annual GDP growth oscillating around 3.5%.

Manufacturing (20%), commerce (18%), private services (14%), and agriculture (12%) are the biggest estimated economic sectors in Guatemala. The country's economic structure shows a declining trend in the agricultural sector.

Guatemala is the third biggest country in Central America. It has one of the highest disparities between rich and poor as well as one of the highest poverty levels worldwide, with 54% of the population living below the poverty line in 2006 and 54% in 2011. According to the United Nations Development Programme (UNDP), the Multidimensional Poverty Index (MPI), which looks at multiple deprivations in the same household in regard to education, health and standard of living, found that in 2011, 25.9% of the population experienced multiple deprivations and another 9.8% were vulnerable to such deprivations. A human development report also states that the average percentage of multidimensional poverty in 2011 was 49.1%.

Poor women and unpaid work

In Guatemala in 2010, 31% of the female population was illiterate. In rural Guatemala, 70.5% are poor; women are more likely to be poor in the more rural areas. Gammage argues that women in poor households engage more in domestic tasks and undertake more household maintenance, social reproduction and care work than men. Similarly, Benería states that the women perform tough work but do not get paid and argues that there is an opportunity cost related, since the women could be paid for other work instead. Unpaid household work is associated with the number of people in the household, the location, and the availability of paid employment. This means that women in rural Guatemala are greater victims of poverty than urban women, and most poverty is found in the rural parts of Guatemala, so Gammage found that many rural women perform unpaid work.

Educated women and the labor force

The labor force participation rate for women in Guatemala was at 41% in 2018. Women have a small pay disadvantage, earning 97% of male wages in most occupations. Gender inequality declines if women have a second and/or third educational degree, and they are treated more equally with their male counterparts. As in many countries, both men and women earn the most if they have a university degree. The percent of women with a steady income increases for women who have completed the secondary level of schooling, but decreases again after university. This means that women earn about the same as men if they both have a secondary education, but after university, men earn more. The situation changes on the professional level, where women earn more than men. Men work more hours in all professions, except in the household, because many women have part-time jobs.

Child labor
Children in Guatemala are engaged in child labor, primarily in agriculture, according to the U.S. Department of Labor. In fact, 13.4% of children aged 7 to 14 work; 68% of them are in the agricultural sector, 13% in the industrial sector, and 18% in the services sector. The 2013 DOL report stated that "Guatemala [...] lacks Government programs targeting sectors in which children are known to engage in exploitative labor, such as domestic service, mining, quarrying, and construction."
In December 2014, the Department's List of Goods Produced by Child Labor or Forced Labor included mostly agricultural goods produced in such working conditions, namely broccoli, coffee, corn and sugarcane. Guatemala's firework and gravel production also resorted to child labor according to the report.

Maquilas

Among the most important factors in Guatemala's economy are the significant number of Korean-owned maquila factories in the highlands of Guatemala. Korean entrepreneurs have adopted a buyer-driven commodity chain process that depends on the existence of a large labor force, low capital investment and low skills. Korea presents itself to Guatemalan industry and to Guatemalan workers by means of subcontractors responsible for delivering finished orders to multiple buyers, mostly located in the United States. Buyers include Macy's and JCPenney and brands such as Liz Claiborne, OshKosh and Tracy Evans.

The first industries began in 1980s. At first, workers were very interested in the new jobs in the factories, because they offered the opportunity to transition to what was seen as a new and modern world, away from agricultural work. However, in the factories, workers' backs hurt, because they sat for many hours on backless benches in front of sewing machines. Workers would usually enter the plant at 7:00 a.m. and take a 1-hour break for lunch at noon. They were expected to work until 7:00 or 8:00pm. About 70% of the workers in macula factories were female. Years later, there was a huge turnover. Workers started to leave the macula factories for reasons like stress, bad treatment, poor payment, etc.

Economic priorities

Current economic priorities include:
 Liberalizing the trade regime;
 Financial services sector reform;
 Overhauling Guatemala's public finances;
 Simplifying the tax structure, enhancing tax compliance, and broadening the tax base.
 Improving the investment climate through procedural and regulatory simplification and adopting a goal of concluding treaties to protect investment and intellectual property rights.

Import tariffs have been lowered in conjunction with Guatemala's Central American neighbors so that most fall between 0% and 15%, with further reductions planned. Responding to Guatemala's changed political and economic policy environment, the international community has mobilized substantial resources to support the country's economic and social development objectives. The United States, along with other donor countries—especially France, Italy, Spain, Germany, Japan, and the international financial institutions—have increased development project financing. Donors' response to the need for international financial support funds for implementation of the Peace Accords is, however, contingent upon Guatemalan government reforms and counterpart financing.

Problems hindering economic growth include high crime rates, illiteracy and low levels of education, and an inadequate and underdeveloped capital market. They also include lack of infrastructure, particularly in the transportation, telecommunications, and electricity sectors, although the state telephone company and electricity distribution were privatized in 1998. The distribution of income and wealth remains highly skewed. The wealthiest 10% of the population receives almost one-half of all income, and the top 20% receives two-thirds of all income. Approximately 29% of the population lives in poverty, and 6% of that number live in extreme poverty. Guatemala's social indicators, such as infant mortality and illiteracy, are successively improving, but remain in low growth and are still among the worst in the hemisphere. In 2000 the percentage of girls completing primary school was approximately 52%. That percentage rose in 2010 to about 81%. The completion rate in primary school for boys in 2000 was 63% and rose to 87% in 2010.

In 2005 Guatemala ratified its signature to the Dominican Republic-Central America Free Trade Agreement (DR-CAFTA) between the United States and several other Central American countries.

The electricity sector is being privatized, resulting in very high prices. In rural areas, although electricity consumption per household is very low, the ratings can represent more than 20% of farmers' salaries according to the Comité de développement paysan (Codeca). Since privatization, the price per kilowatthour has risen to the point of becoming one of the most expensive in Latin America. To protest against this situation and demand the renationalization of electrical services, Codeca members organized demonstrations and exposed themselves to repression. Between 2012 and 2014, 97 people were imprisoned, 220 wounded and 17 killed.

2009 food crisis
In September 2009, Guatemalan President Álvaro Colom declared that lack of food and proper nutrition were a national emergency. Colom stated that the situation is the combined result of a severe drought and global warming, which have reduced the domestic food supply, and the global financial crisis, which reduced Guatemala's ability to import food. Colom said the government would immediately seek assistance from the international community for emergency food supplies.

A number of international organizations expressed concern about Guatemala's current economic status in 2009. The United Nations World Food Programme (WFP) and the World Bank reported the following:

Guatemala has the fourth highest rate of chronic malnutrition in the world and the highest in the western hemisphere.
Approximately 75% of Guatemalans live below the poverty level, which is defined as an income that is not sufficient to purchase a basic basket of goods and basic services.
Approximately 58% of the population have incomes below the extreme poverty line, which is defined as the amount needed to purchase a basic basket of food.
Approximately 50% of Guatemalan children under the age of 5 now suffer from chronic under-nutrition.
In the nation's highlands, where many indigenous people live, 70% of children under age 5 are malnourished.

Agriculture
Guatemala is the world leader in Cardamom production and export. As of 2013, demand for biofuels has resulted in diversion of land from subsistence agriculture to sugar cane and African Palm plantations. Much of the land is owned by large landlords. Due to legal requirements for production of biofuels in the United States the price of maize, a Guatemalan staple, has risen sharply. Agriculture accounts for 60% of Guatemalan exports and employs more than 50% of the labor force.

In 2018, Guatemala produced 35.5 million tons of sugarcane (it's one of the 10 largest producers in the world) and 4 million tons of banana (it's one of the 15 largest world producers). In addition, in the same year it produced 2.3 million tons of palm oil, 245 thousand tons of coffee, 1.9 million tons of maize, 623 thousand tons of melon, 312 thousand tons of pineapple, 564 thousand tons of potato, 349 thousand tons of rubber, 331 thousand tons of tomato, 253 thousand tons of beans, 124 thousand tons of avocado, 124 thousand tons of lemon, 177 thousand tons of orange, 120 thousand tons of cauliflower and broccoli, 93 thousand tons of papaya, 107 thousand tons of watermelon, 98 thousand tons of carrot, 75 thousand tons of cabbage, 84 thousand tons of lettuce and chicory, 38 thousand tons of cardamom in addition to smaller productions of other agricultural products.

Scale 
The agricultural sector of Guatemala's economy consists of two types of producers: numerous small-scale peasant-owned farms in the highlands, and fewer medium- to large-scale operations in the more fertile lowlands. The smaller farms produce staples for Guatemalan consumption, such as beans and maize, as well as fruits and vegetables for export. Larger farms produce export and plantation products like bananas, sugar cane, coffee, and rubber and palm oil. While 88% of agricultural land in Guatemala is in large-scale farms, 92% of all farms in Guatemala are small. Large farms produce 1/3 more per hectare than small farms, but employ fewer people overall.

Non-traditional agricultural exports 
The shift to the production of non-traditional agricultural exports (NTAE) is a strategy used by developing countries like Guatemala to grow the agricultural sector and decreasing inequality by including the rural poor in the benefits of globalization. The most important NTAE crops in Guatemala include
 fruit like mangos, melons, and berries
 vegetables like cauliflower, cabbage, broccoli, and snow peas
 organic crops such as coffee. The value of non-traditional agricultural export crops has increased from $146 million US in 1992 to $262 million in 2001. IN 1998, NTAE accounted for 8.7 percent of the total exports. NTAE production largely comes from small-scale farmers. While the farmers who are involved in this market are not failing, this market limits their capital accumulation to slow growth, and therefore they are not able to profit highly off of this market.

Gender 
The agricultural sector of Guatemala is differentiated by gender, and this differential can be seen in several different areas within the sector. More men than women inherit or buy land individually, although many houses choose to rent land instead of buying it. Additionally, there is a gender gap in the division of agricultural labor. Traditionally, men dominated subsistence production and agricultural production for domestic markets, while women had roles in small animal production, craft production, and the selling of products in regional rather than national markets. With the shift toward NTAE, there has also been an increase in field labor for women. Additionally, women have been included in land-use decision processes in NTAE production. Sarah Hamilton, Linda Asturias de Barrios, and Brenda Tevalán have stated that despite a traditional patriarchal structure in Guatemala, NTAE production is associated with increased independence and equality between men and women.

Macroeconomic development

Guatemala became more economically developed and stable from 1990 to 2011. The annual GDP growth rate for Guatemala in 2000 was 3.6%, but just 0.9% in 2009, increasing slightly in 2010 to 2.0% 
The poverty rate in Guatemala in 2006 was 54.8%, and the extreme poverty rate was 26.1%. Latin America as a whole had a poverty rate of 33% and an extreme poverty rate of 12.9% in 2009. The data indicate that Guatemala is behind other Latin American countries, in terms of lowering poverty rates, but there has been an increase in economic activity in terms of GDP and development. Guatemala's HDI increased from 0.462 in 1990, to 0.525 in 2000, to 0.550 in 2005, and 0.574 in 2011.3 Guatemala ranked 131st in HDI in 2011. Other important human development statistics such as the total fertility rate in Guatemala decreased from 4.8 births per woman in 2000 to 4.2 births per woman in 2006. During the same period, life expectancy increased from 67.9 years in 2000, to 69.9 years in 2006.

The following table shows the main economic indicators in 1980–2021 (with IMF staff estimates in 2022–2027). Inflation below 5% is in green. The annual unemployment rate is extracted from the World Bank, although the International Monetary Fund find them unreliable.

Electrical infrastructure in rural Guatemala 

In Guatemala lack of access to electricity is concentrated in rural areas, although informal settlements around urban peripheries also tend to lack metered service. Guatemala's post-civil war efforts to improve electrical access in the countryside have proceeded under the auspices of the Rural Electrification Plan (Spanish: PER), a public-private partnership between the government's Ministry of Education and Mines (Mineduc) and private power companies. Over the period 2000 to 2011, the PER improved rates of electrical grid connectivity among non-indigenous (62 to 82 percent) and indigenous (48 to 70 percent) households in Guatemala. Continuity of the electrical grid is robust, with both groups reporting only about one hour per day of unavailability. Even when rural users are connected to the grid and pay subsidized rates, they often have difficulty affording electrical appliances, which translates into low power consumption (less than five percent of average US residential usage). This low power usage by rural customers is often not profitable for power companies, disincentivizing further expansion of the grid. As of 2014, one third of Guatemala's poorest rural residents still lacked electricity. By contrast, only around 8% of high-income rural residents lacked service, demonstrating that affordability plays a role in the accessibility of electrical grids.

In 2016, domestic hydroelectric power supplied the majority (about 34 percent) of Guatemala's electricity. The planning process for constructing new hydropower dams was updated by the Guatemalan Congress in 1996 and 2007 (Decree 93–96, the "General Law of Electricity"), giving project developers more power over the process, especially with regards to environmental impact assessments (EIA). A study in Guatemala covering the period 2009 to 2014 found that private construction firms generally have little knowledge of the rights of rural indigenous peoples their projects may be affecting. Firms typically hire consultants to perform EIAs and liaise with affected communities. However, consultants are frequently disinterested in adequately informing rural communities of the potential impacts of proposed projects. Instead, consultants frequently resort to bribery and manipulation to obtain consent to proceed with hydroelectric projects. Interlocutors from within the government say that there is internal pressure to approve EIAs even if they are performed inadequately, showing that visions of Guatemala's energy future may be overriding the interests of segments of its populace.

External links

World Bank Summary Trade Statistics Guatemala
Tariffs applied by Guatemala as provided by ITC's Market Access Map, an online database of customs tariffs and market requirements.

References 

 
Guatemala